Michael Emile Mahfood (June 21, 1949 - September 21, 2021) was the founder of  Group M7 (est. 1995), a web service company in the United States. Group M7 currently manages in excess of 2,000 websites.

Michael served a term on the CHRISTUS Trinity Mother Frances Foundation Board beginning in 2017.  Since then he has provided ongoing leadership through his service on the CTMF Foundation Community Health Care Innovation Fund Committee and is responsible for assisting in awarding approximately $1 million annually back to Northeast Texas non-profits with an emphasis on improving Catholic health care and education. From November 2012 through July 2017, he served as the chairman of the Finance Board of the Catholic Diocese of Tyler, Texas, under Bishop Joseph Strickland. He also served from 1986 to 1991 as a personal secretary to Bishop Charles Herzig, the first bishop of the Diocese of Tyler. In support of the Church in East Texas, he is the sponsor of the Michael  and Suzann Mahfood Scholarship, which assists in the advancement of Catholic education. In September 2017, Mahfood was elected to the Holy Apostles College and Seminary Board of Directors.

His publications include "Browsers, Business and Bandwidth: A Personal Journey down the Information Highway from the Beginnings of the World Wide Web to the Present", published by Rutgers University's Decision Line in October 2010, and many articles written for Tyler Today over the span of a decade.

His knowledge of technology and Internet workings is often used by local news media.

References

American businesspeople
1949 births
Living people